Federico Borromeo, iuniore (29 May 1617 – 18 February 1673) was a Roman Catholic cardinal.

Biography
On 30 Nov 1654, he was consecrated bishop by Francesco Peretti di Montalto, Archbishop of Monreale, with Giovan Battista Foppa, Archbishop of Benevento, and Giovanni Battista Scanaroli, Titular Bishop of Sidon, serving as co-consecrators.

Episcopal succession

References

1617 births
1673 deaths
Apostolic Nuncios to Switzerland
Apostolic Nuncios to Spain
17th-century Italian cardinals
Inquisitors of Malta